Aziza Gardizi was an Afghan politician. Alongside Homeira Seljuqi, she was one of the first two female Senators nominated in 1965.

Biography
Following the 1965 elections, the first in which women could vote and run for office, Gardizi and Seljuqi were appointed to the Senate by King Mohammed Zahir Shah, while four women were elected to the House of the People. She was reappointed to the Senate following the 1969 elections.

References

20th-century Afghan women politicians
20th-century Afghan politicians
Members of the House of Elders (Afghanistan)